This is a list of electricity-generating power stations in the U.S. state of Nebraska, sorted by type and name.  In 2019, Nebraska had a total summer capacity of 9,466 MW through all of its power plants, and a net generation of 37,298 GWh.  The corresponding electrical energy generation mix was 54.7% coal, 19.3% wind, 18.7% nuclear, 3.6% hydroelectric, 3.4% natural gas, 0.2% biomass and 0.1% solar. Distributed small-scale solar, including customer-owned photovoltaic panels, delivered an additional net 15 GWh to the state's electricity grid.  This compares as half the  amount generated by Nebraska's utility-scale solar facilities.

Nebraska is the only state where all electricity utilities are publicly owned as municipal systems, public districts, or rural cooperatives.  The state has few fossil-fuel reserves but has abundant renewable generation and agricultural resources.  It is an increasing harvester of wind energy and a major producer of biofuels (primarily ethanol), with further potential for biomass generation.  Nebraska has no renewable portfolio standard while supporting net metering.  It was a top-ten state for per-capita energy consumption in 2019 due in large part to its energy-intensive agriculture, meat packing, and food processing industries.  About 10% more electricity was generated than was consumed in-state.

Nuclear power stations

Retired facilities:
 Fort Calhoun Nuclear Generating Station - 480 MW: operated 1973-2016
 Hallam Nuclear Power Facility - 75 MW:  operated 1963-1964

Fossil-fuel power stations
Data from the U.S. Energy Information Administration serves as a general reference.

Coal
A useful map of active and retiring coal generation plants is provided by the Sierra Club.

Natural gas

Petroleum

Renewable power stations
Data from the U.S. Energy Information Administration serves as a general reference.

Biomass

Geothermal
There were no utility-scale geothermal power facilities in the state of Nebraska in 2019.

Hydroelectric

 Kearney canal and dam were completed in 1886, water powered a DC current dynamo by 1889, and an elegant brick powerhouse was constructed in 1890 that also housed a steam engine along with an 800 horsepower turbine. The early system delivered lighting to the city of Kearney and powered a trolley system, but suffered from various equipment and water-delivery issues that persisted after the shift to AC alternating current.   Major reworking of bulkhead, penstock and powerhouse components were completed in 1921.  The historic powerhouse was ultimately demolished in 2007.

Solar

Wind

Storage power stations
There were no utility-scale storage power stations in the state of Nebraska in 2019.

HVDC converter stations

Utilities
 Central Nebraska Public Power & Irrigation District
 Lincoln Electric System
 Nebraska Public Power District
 North Central Public Power District
 Northwest Rural Public Power District
 Omaha Public Power District
 Southern Power District
 Southwest Public Power District

References

Nebraska
 
Lists of buildings and structures in Nebraska
Energy in Nebraska